The Diocese of Malaita is one of the nine current dioceses of the Anglican Church of Melanesia. One of the four original ACOM dioceses, Malaita diocese was erected in January 1975; it is currently subdivided into six regions of 46 parishes.

Malaita Province is the most populous and one of the largest of the nine provinces of Solomon Islands. It is named after its largest island, Malaita. It also includes the remote Ontong Java Atoll and Sikaiana island.

List of bishops

References

Sources
Anglican Church of Melanesia — Diocese of Malaita 

 
Malaita, Diocese of
Melanesia
Christian organizations established in 1975
1975 establishments in Oceania